Mycterophora is a genus of moths of the family Erebidae. The genus was erected by George Duryea Hulst in 1896.

Species
 Mycterophora geometriformis Hill, 1924.
 Mycterophora inexplicata Walker, 1862.
 Mycterophora longipalpata Hulst, 1896 – long-palped mycterophora moth.
 Mycterophora monticola Hulst, 1896.
 Mycterophora rubricans Barnes & McDunnough, 1918.

References

Boletobiinae
Noctuoidea genera